Chef is a 2017 Indian Hindi-language comedy-drama film co-produced and directed by Raja Krishna Menon. It is an official remake of the 2014 American film with the same name. The film stars Saif Ali Khan in the title role.

The film's principal photography began in October 2016 in Kochi. Chef was released on 6 October 2017. The film under-performed at the box office.

Plot
Roshan Kalra (Saif Ali Khan) is a chef by profession, and for him, food, love, and work all go together. His passion towards his career supersedes everything in his life, even his family. He lives away from his wife Radha Menon (Padmapriya) and son Aari (Svar Kamble). After a long time, he decides to visit his son in Cochin and they have a good time together. But soon a realization sinks in him when it is time to go back to work. He feels amidst chasing his passion and ambition, he has lost out on a lot of time with Aari.
 
Thus, Roshan decides to stay back with him and open a food truck which serves both his purposes in life- cooking food and being with his son.

Cast
Saif Ali Khan as Roshan Kalra
Padmapriya Janakiraman as Radha Menon
Svar Kamble as Armaan Karla (Ary)
Chandan Roy Sanyal as Nuzrool
Dinesh Prabhakar as Alex Oomen 
Milind Soman as Biju
Sobhita Dhulipala as Vinnie
Ramgopal Bajaj as Mr. Kalra, Roshan's Father
Pawan Chopra as Sunil Manohari 
Shayan Munshi as Prateek
Raghu Dixit as himself
Neha Saxena as Neha (cameo)
Abhishek Kumar as Dhaba Waiter
Lokesh Mittal as Son of Dhaba Owner
Ramachandran P. P. as Anillettan
M. Gopalakrishnan as Union Leader
Nishad Raj Rana as Chaudhary (Delhi Cop)
 Rajat Ajay Bose

Soundtrack

The original songs and background score of the film were composed by Raghu Dixit. The song Tere Mere and its reprise were composed by guest composer Amaal Mallik. The lyrics have been penned by Ankur Tewari and Rashmi Virag. The first song of the film titled as "Shugal Laga Le" composed and sung by Raghu Dixit was released 6 September 2017. The second song "Tere Mere" sung by Armaan Malik was released on 11 September 2017. The third song titled as "Banjara"  which is sung by Vishal Dadlani was released on 18 September 2017. The soundtrack was released on 26 September 2017 by T-Series.

Critical reception
Raja Sen of NDTV gave the film a rating of 2 out of 5 saying that, "Saif Ali Khan and the actors try hard, but lazy writing and direction make Chef a flavourless and bland meal". Meena Iyer of The Times of India praised the performance of Saif Ali Khan, the leading actor of the film and gave the film a rating of 3.5 out of 5 saying that, "Chef is predictable in parts, the journey is an enjoyable one." Sweta Kaushal of Hindustan Times gave the film a rating of 1.5 out of 5 and said that, "Saif Ali Khan's Chef offers moments of brilliance which, if weaved in a more organised manner, may have given us a light, affable film. But a lazy and rather uninterested narrative takes away the pleasure."

Sukanya Verma of Rediff gave the film a rating of 2.5 out of 5 and said that, "In a premise begging for food porn, there's a shocking scarcity of sensory pleasure or vision. Chef is too dull to be delicious." Shubhra Gupta of The Indian Express gave the film a rating of 2 out of 5 and said that, "Saif Ali Khan's film has some interesting flavours. But 'Chef' feels derivative, and is a late coming of age tale of Peter-Pan-like adults. And that's got to do with the uneven writing. It is a good-looking film, with good-looking people only." Rajeev Masand gave the film a rating of 2.5 out of 5 saying that, "Chef isn't perfect; it lags in places, offers quick-fix solutions to characters’ problems, and feels wholly familiar. But at a little over two hours, it doesn't ask much of you, and offers some pleasure in Saif Ali Khan's return to form as an actor hard to look away from."

References

External links

2017 films
2010s Hindi-language films
Indian comedy-drama films
Indian remakes of American films
Films about food and drink
Films about chefs
Cooking films
Films scored by Raghu Dixit
Hindi remakes of English films
Films shot in Kochi
Films with screenplays by Ritesh Shah
T-Series (company) films